Parablennius goreensis is a species of combtooth blenny found in the eastern  Atlantic ocean.  This species reaches a length of  SL. The specific name refers to the type locality, Gorée, in Senegal.

References

gorrensis
Fish described in 1836
Fish of the Atlantic Ocean
Fish of Africa
Tropical fish